The Young European of the Year title is awarded by the Schwarzkopf Foundation to people between the ages of 18 and 28 who have worked in an honorary capacity towards the understanding between peoples or European integration, and in the process have achieved exemplary success.

Winners

References

European awards
European Parliament
E
Awards established in 1997